Zapayán is a town and municipality of the Magdalena Department in northern Colombia.

References

External links
 Gobernacion del Magdalena - Zapayan

Municipalities of Magdalena Department